KNDY may refer to:

 KNDY (AM), a radio station (1570 AM) licensed to Marysville, Kansas, United States
 KNDY-FM, a radio station (95.5 FM) licensed to Marysville, Kansas, United States